Gyas is a genus of harvestmen in the family Sclerosomatidae.

Species
Two species are recognized:
Gyas annulatus (Olivier, 1791)
Gyas titanus Simon, 1879

References

Harvestman genera
Taxa described in 1879
Arachnids of Europe